

Results by constituency
The results of the 2019 United Kingdom general election by constituency were as follows:

England

Northern Ireland

Scotland

Wales

See also
Results of the 2017 United Kingdom general election
Results of the 2015 United Kingdom general election
Results of the 2010 United Kingdom general election
List of political parties in the United Kingdom
List of United Kingdom by-elections (1979–present)
Opinion polling for the 2019 United Kingdom general election

Notes

References

2019 United Kingdom general election
Results of United Kingdom general elections by parliamentary constituency